Jarl Fagerström (12 April 1914 in Porvoo – 5 December 1975) is a Finnish sprint canoeist who in the early 1950s. He finished sixth in the C-1 10000 m event at the 1952 Summer Olympics in Helsinki.

References 
Sports-reference.com profile

1914 births
1975 deaths
People from Porvoo
Canoeists at the 1952 Summer Olympics
Finnish male canoeists
Olympic canoeists of Finland
Sportspeople from Uusimaa